Ornithine transcarbamylase (OTC) (also called ornithine carbamoyltransferase) is an enzyme that catalyzes the reaction between carbamoyl phosphate (CP) and ornithine (Orn) to form citrulline (Cit) and phosphate (Pi). There are two classes of OTC: anabolic and catabolic. This article focuses on anabolic OTC. Anabolic OTC facilitates the sixth step in the biosynthesis of the amino acid arginine in prokaryotes. In contrast, mammalian OTC plays an essential role in the urea cycle, the purpose of which is to capture toxic ammonia and transform it into urea, a less toxic nitrogen source, for excretion.

Reaction mechanism

Structure 
OTC is a trimeric protein. There are three active sites of the protein which are located at the cleft between the monomers. The carbamoyl phosphate binding domain resides on the N-terminal end of each monomer, while the C-terminal end contains the binding domain for ornithine. Both binding domains have a similar structural pattern with a central parallel β-pleated sheet bordered by α-helices and loops. In addition to the binding domains, OTCs have SMG loops. These swing to close the binding site once both substrates have bound. SMG stands for the conserved amino acid motif of Ser-Met-Gly. Upon closure, these residues interact with L-ornithine. The binding of CP induces a global conformational change, while the binding of L-ornithine only induces movement of the SMG loop to close and isolate the activation site.

Active site 

Ser-Thr-Arg-Thr-Arg motif from one subunit and a His from the neighboring subunit both interact with the phosphate group of CP for binding. Binding the primary nitrogen of CP are residues Gln, Cys, and Arg. The carbonyl oxygen of CP is bound by residues Thr, Arg, and His.

Amino acid composition 
 Plant OTCs have the largest difference from other OTCs. There are 50 to 70% less Leu residues, while there are twice as many Arg residues. The number of subunits in OTCs vary from 322 to 340 residues. Animals have the highest density of Leu. This residue breakdown causes a pI for the animal enzyme of 6.8 while the plant enzyme has a pI of 7.6. Rat, bovine, and human OTC have the same C terminal residue of phenylalanine. Their N-terminal residues on the other hand differ. Rat ends with Ser, bovine with aspartate, and human with glycine.

Genomics 
The human OTC gene is located on the short arm of chromosome X (Xp21.1). The gene is located in the Watson (plus) strand and is 73 kbases in length. The open reading frame of 1,062 nucleotides is disbursed between 10 exons and nine introns.  The encoded protein is 354 amino acids long with a predicted molecular weight of 39.935 kD. Postranscriptional modification leaves the mature peptide with 322 amino acids and a weight of 36.1 kD. The protein is located in the mitochondrial matrix. In mammals, OTC is expressed in the liver and small intestinal mucosa.

Human mutations 
341 mutations in human OTC have been reported. At least 259 of these mutations are considered to be disease-causing mutations.  149 of these mutations are known to cause onset of hyperammonemia during the first weeks of life. 70 manifest as hyperammonemia in male patients later in life. Most of the mutations occur in known functional motifs, such as the SMG loop or CP binding domains.

Deficiency

Mutations in the OTC gene can cause Ornithine Transcarbamylase deficiency. It is classified as a urea cycle disorder due to the fact that without proper OTC function  ammonia starts to accumulate in the blood. Accumulation of ammonia in the blood is known as hyperammonemia. Although toxic in excess, ammonia is a nitrogen source for the body. Therefore increased ammonia will also increase levels of the nitrogen-containing non-essential amino acids glutamate, glutamine, and alanine. Levels of carbamoyl phosphate (CP) will begin to drop as urea nitrogen levels in the blood decrease. This will cause CP to be diverted to the uridine monophosphate synthetic pathway. Orotic acid is a product of this pathway. Increased levels of orotic acid in urine can be an indicator that a patient is suffering from a disorder linked to hyperammonemia.

OTC deficiency manifests in both early and late onset forms.

Early onset 
Early onset is seen in newborns. The symptoms of a urea cycle disorder are often not seen until the child is at home and may not be recognized in a timely manner by the family and primary care physician. Symptoms in young children with hyperammonemia are non-specific: not willing to eat, problems with breathing, body temperature, seizures, unusual body movements (twitches) and somnolence. As ammonia build up continues, symptoms progress from somnolence to lethargy potentially ending in a coma. Abnormal posturing (uncontrolled movement)  and encephalopathy (brain damage) are often related to the degree of central nervous system swelling and pressure upon the brainstem. About 50% of neonates with severe hyperammonemia have seizures.

Late onset 
In milder (or partial) urea cycle enzyme deficiencies, ammonia accumulation may be triggered by illness or stress at almost any time of life, resulting in multiple mild elevations of plasma ammonia concentration [Bourrier et al. 1988]. Patients with partial enzyme deficiencies may have a delay of symptoms for months or years. Indicators that you maybe suffering from OTC deficiency or a urea cycle disorder include "episodes of delirium, erratic behavior, or reduced consciousness, headaches, vomiting, aversion to foods high in protein, and seizures."

Treatment 
A potential treatment for the high ammonia levels is to give sodium benzoate, which combines with glycine to produce hippurate, at the same time removing an ammonium group. Biotin also plays an important role in the functioning of the OTC enzyme and has been shown to reduce ammonia intoxication in animal experiments. Additionally, the use of whole-body therapeutic hypothermia (TH) has been proposed and studied as a treatment. TH is thought to increase the effectiveness of dialysis to extract ammonia from the body.

References

Further reading

External links 
  GeneReviews/NCBI/NIH/UW entry on Urea Cycle Disorders Overview

EC 2.1.3
Urea cycle